Villa Anneslie is a historic home located at Towson, Baltimore County, Maryland, United States. It was built about 1855 as a summer home. Designed by architect John Rudolph Niernsee, it is an Italianate two-story villa built in brick and covered in clapboard.  It features an asymmetrical design with a central three story tower over the entrance.

Villa Anneslie was listed on the National Register of Historic Places in 1977.

References

External links

, including undated photo, at Maryland Historical Trust

Houses in Baltimore County, Maryland
Houses on the National Register of Historic Places in Maryland
Italianate architecture in Maryland
Houses completed in 1855
National Register of Historic Places in Baltimore County, Maryland